Herman Henry Bernard Meyer (1864  January 16, 1937) was an American librarian. Meyer attended the Pratt Institute Library School. He worked in several positions at the Library of Congress, including the Head of the Newspaper and Periodical Division (1907), the Chief Bibliographer (1914-1920), and the Head of the Legislative Reference Service (1921-1935) and initiated the Library's services for the blind.

He was president of the American Library Association from 1924 to 1925.

References

 

1864 births
1937 deaths
American librarians
Presidents of the American Library Association
Librarians at the Library of Congress
Pratt Institute alumni
Presidents of the Bibliographical Society of America